A partial lunar eclipse took place on Tuesday, August 5, 1952. The Earth's shadow on the moon was clearly visible in this eclipse, with 53.2% of the Moon in shadow; the partial eclipse lasted for 2 hours and 27 minutes. The moon's apparent diameter was larger and Supermoon because the eclipse occurred only 45 minutes before perigee.

Visibility
The partial eclipse was visible from Europe, Africa, Asia, and Australia, seen rising over eastern South America and Atlantic, and setting over Pacific.

Related lunar eclipses

Lunar year series

Half-Saros cycle
A lunar eclipse will be preceded and followed by solar eclipses by 9 years and 5.5 days (a half saros). This lunar eclipse is related to two annular solar eclipses of Solar Saros 125.

See also
List of lunar eclipses
List of 20th-century lunar eclipses

Notes

External links

1952-08
1952 in science
August 1952 events